Platanus kerrii is an evergreen tree, native to Southeast Asia. The leaves are elliptical to lanceolate. The fruits are borne in globose heads, each of which is sessile on a long peduncle. There are up to 12 heads on a peduncle.

It differs from other species in the genus in being a tropical plant, evergreen, having unlobed leaves, and in the leaf stem not enclosing the axillary bud at its base. The bark flakes off as with other species, and the trunk of a mature tree appears similar to that of the other species.

It is sometimes placed in its own subgenus casteneophyllum, and it has been proposed that this species should be separated out into its own genus.

The plant is named after A. F. G. Kerr, who collected the type specimen in Laos in 1932.

References

kerrii
Trees of Laos
Trees of Vietnam
Vulnerable flora of Asia